Heidi Campbell is the name of:

Heidi Campbell (politician), Tennessee state senator
Heidi Campbell (professor), communications professor at Texas A&M University